Tondi may refer to:

 Tondi, Tallinn, district of Kristiine, Tallinn, Estonia
 Ibrahim Tondi (born 1985), Nigerien hurdler
 Tondi Elektroonika, factory for electrotechnical components located in Tallinn, Estonia

See also 

 Tondo (disambiguation)
 Tyndis, Greek name of Tondi, an ancient Indian port on the Malabar Coast during the Chera kingdom
 Thondi or Tondi, town in Tamil Nadu, India, ancient port during the Pandyan kingdom